Kazakhstan participated in the 2014 Asian Games in Incheon, South Korea from 19 September to 4 October 2014.

Medal summary

Medal table

References

https://web.archive.org/web/20140924172946/http://www.incheon2014ag.org/Sports/Medals/MenuMedallists/?discipline=ALL&Date=ALL&NOC=KAZ&lang=en

Nations at the 2014 Asian Games
2014
Asian Games